A punk house is a dwelling occupied by members of the punk subculture.

Punk houses are often centered on certain political or personal ideologies. It is not uncommon for a punk house to be anarchist, strictly straight-edge, or vegan.  A clique of punks may start a punk house by squatting an abandoned building, by renting, or by owning property. Punk houses are often communally inhabited in an attempt to minimize the individual expense of rent or property tax.

Punk houses serve as backdrops for local scenes; punk houses often provide overnight shelter to touring punk rock bands, and sometimes serve as a venue for shows.  Bands or record labels sometimes form in a particular punk house. Many punk houses have associated punk zines that sometimes share the name of the house. Groups of anarcho-punks run their houses as communes. Inhabitants sometimes identify their houses with unique names and symbols so they can represent their residence with clothing, slogans, and graffiti.

Photographer Abby Banks released Punkhouse: Interiors in Anarchy, a book of punk house photography that catalogs many such places in the United States.

Notable examples

 The Ashtray, West Oakland, California – A Late 80's punk house home to members of Operation Ivy, Isocracy and Filth. Mentioned in numerous fanzine articles and songs including those of Absolutely Zippo, Cometbus, Screeching Weasel, The Lookouts and Blatz.
 Lost Cross, Carbondale, Illinois – A house serving as a practice space, venue, and hangout continuously since 1986.
 Calgary Manor, Calgary, Alberta – venue occupied by members of Calgary punk scene and featured in the film Another State of Mind.
 C-Squat, New York City – Residence and music venue; occupied by members of Leftöver Crack and other punk bands.
 Dial House, Essex, England  – home of Crass
 Die Slaughterhaus, Atlanta, Georgia – residence, venue and record label; occupied by members of Black Lips, Deerhunter and other bands.
 Dischord House, Arlington, Virginia - residence, practice and recording space and home of Dischord Records; rented by members of Minor Threat and later purchased by Ian MacKaye
 Positive Force House, Arlington, Virginia – former residence of Positive Force D.C.
 The Dustbin Family (also known as Dirty-6th), Boise, Idaho - an anarchist punk house active in the 2010s which housed the band Mind Drips and the musician Bob! Loudly, referenced in Loudly's music and the essay "Anarchy Against Hierarchy" by Thomas Pulliam 
 The BFG, Appleton, Wisconsin – venue occupied by members of Tenement, Wartorn, Technicolor Teeth, and The Parish.
The Black Hole, Fullerton, California - subject of the Adolescents's song "Kids of the Black Hole"
 The Rat Palace, Vancouver, Canada – Legendary punk house on Broadway near Arbutus, active from late 70s to mid-80s.
 The 309 House, Pensacola, Florida – Active since at least 1978.

See also
Battle of Ryesgade
Hackerspace
Housing cooperative
Social center
Squatting
 "Punkhouse", a song by Screeching Weasel
 "Kids of the Black Hole" by The Adolescents

References

Anarchist culture
Anarcho-punk
DIY culture
Social centres

Urban decay